Navis is a municipality in the district Innsbruck-Land in the Austrian state of Tyrol located 19 km southeast of Innsbruck in a valley with the same name which is a side valley of the Wipptal. The extensive territory of this municipality runs from the Sill up to the 2,359 m high Klammjoch saddle and the 2,886 m high Lizumer Reckner in the Tux Alps.  The village is provided with fresh drinking water thanks to the clean Navisbach. The origin of the village name is unknown but settlement began at the end of the 13th century. Copper and silver were found in the 15th and 16th century.

Population

References

External links

Cities and towns in Innsbruck-Land District